Theodore Roosevelt High School is an educational institution (grades 9–12) located in the  Boyle Heights area of Los Angeles, California named for the 26th president of the United States.

Roosevelt is a public school in the Los Angeles Unified School District with an enrollment 1,400 as of 2017. The enrollment peaked at 5,047 in 2007, making it one of the largest in the country, and second largest behind Belmont High School at the time. From the mid-1990s until the 2008–09 school year, the school followed a year-round calendar. In 2008, the school started to be managed by the Partnership for Los Angeles Schools, which was established by Los Angeles Mayor Antonio Villaraigosa. In 2010, the single institution was split up into seven small schools, each with its own principal, CEEB code (used by SAT, colleges, etc.), students and staff. The outcomes of this were debated by students and administrators. Since 2013, Roosevelt has been merged into a single comprehensive high school. The Roosevelt campus also hosts the Math, Science and Technology Magnet Academy at Roosevelt High School and the STEM Academy of Boyle Heights, an LAUSD Pilot School that was formed in 2014.

Its school colors are red and gold, the mascot is Teddy the Bear, and their sport teams are known as the Rough Riders. The school's motto is "Don't flinch, don't foul, hit the line hard!", which is a Theodore Roosevelt quote.

Most students come from Boyle Heights, with some traveling from South Central, East Los Angeles, and City Terrace.

Roosevelt participates in the annual "East L.A. Classic" against Garfield High School. It is the homecoming game for both schools and attracts over 20,000 people every year.

The school's $173 million comprehensive modernization project began in 2018.

History 
Roosevelt was founded in 1922, but opened in 1923 in Boyle Heights to the east of the Los Angeles River.

Roosevelt High School became categorized as a “Mexican school” along with Lincoln High School, Garfield High School, and others near East L.A. This categorization derived in the twentieth century when an abundance of Mexican immigrants enrolled in public schools and school boards segregated the establishments. Nearly 83 percent of Roosevelt's students were of Mexican descent.

As the population grew in the area, Roosevelt sought expansion. The R-Building (R for Roosevelt) was the main building and faced Fickett Street. The street was vacated and a new administration (A-Building for administration) was constructed. Many new buildings were created and added to campus.  The R-building has an interesting history and distinct architecture. There was a fourth floor to the building which had to be closed due to damage from a fire. The basement was built with a shooting range for the Junior ROTC (JROTC), although only air rifles may be used now.

Roosevelt was one of the five schools to initiate the student walkouts in 1968, and contributed to the walkouts in 2006, in protest to the HR 4437 bill.  The school has partnered with Planned Parenthood, which operates a clinic at the school providing birth control, pregnancy testing, screening for sexually transmitted diseases and counseling, in an effort to reduce the area's high incidence of teenage pregnancies.

In 2009 the opening of the Felicitas and Gonzalo Mendez Learning Centers helped to expand Roosevelt.

East LA Walkouts 
The East LA Walkouts or Blowouts were a result of long endured injustices involving students at East LA high schools. The curriculum of "Mexican schools" was designed to prepare its students to eventually join the working-class in place of their parents because graduation rates were so low. The Watts Riots of 1965 proved to students that resistance was necessary for social changes. Students were determined to change the curriculum and as the Chicano Movement was taking place, Sal Castro, a teacher at Lincoln High School, organized the East L.A. Walkouts. Approximately 10,000 students from Roosevelt, Lincoln, Belmont, Garfield, and Wilson High Schools participated with support from teachers, parents, college students, and community members.

With Castro's help, students from the high schools formed a central committee to plan actions. After the principal at Wilson High School cancelled the senior class play on March 1, 1968, enraged students participated in an impromptu walkout. This situation called for a central committee meeting to decide whether all schools would engage in a larger walkout. However, Garfield High students decided for themselves and staged a campus-wide walkout on March 5. Shortly after, walkouts ensued at Roosevelt and Lincoln. The last walkout took place on March 8 and ended at Hazard Park which is a short distance from Roosevelt High School.

Japanese American internment camps 
When Japan bombed Pearl Harbor in December 1941, Japanese Americans were forced into internment camps to prevent them from turning on the United States. They were given orders to drop all belongings and expect to be taken away from their communities until further notice. Nearly a third of Roosevelt High School's students were withdrawn because they were Japanese. They were required to attend schools within those camps. However, resources were scarce and classes were limited.

In 1937, prior to their withdrawal from Roosevelt High School, the Japanese American Students Club created a Japanese Garden on campus. The garden was not maintained during World War II, which led to its deterioration. It was rebuilt in 1996 and dedicated to Japanese American students who were victims of displacement during the war.

Demographics 

In 2019 Roosevelt serves around 1,475 students in grades nine through twelve, with a student-teacher ratio of 19:1 and 79 full-time teachers.

All Rankings
US News 2021 Rankings
102 in Los Angeles Unified School District High Schools
381 in Los Angeles metropolitan area High Schools
1,129 in California High Schools
9,994 in National Rankins

US News 2020 Rankings
164 in Los Angeles Unified School District High Schools
376 in Los Angeles metropolitan area High Schools
1,144 in California High Schools
10,680 in National Rankins

US News 2019 Rankings
333 in Los Angeles metropolitan area High Schools
974 in California High Schools
7,852 in National Rankings

Academic Performance Index (API)
API for High Schools in the LAUSD District 5 and local small public charter high schools in the East Los Angeles region.

The East LA Classic 
The East L.A. Classic is the homecoming game for Roosevelt High School and Garfield High School, . The classic has taken place since a few years after the opening of the two schools, with the exception of the Depression and World War II. The classic brings out alumni from all parts of the world, usually fielding 20,000 people per game and has been held at the East Los Angeles College at the Weingart Stadium although it has been held at the Los Angeles Memorial Coliseum.

Artwork
The artist Nelyollotl Toltecatl painted a  mural, known as the Anahuac Mural, on two outside walls of Roosevelt depicting murder, rape, and enslavement of Native Americans by European colonizers. In 1996 Toltecatl, who was previously known under a Spanish name, began to work on a mural intended to depict Chicano history and assimilation. After about a year of work on the project, the tone of his mural changed after attending a lecture by Olin Tezcatlipoca.

Prior to the demolition of the Sixth Street Viaduct, (also known as the Sixth Street Bridge) Los Angeles mayor Eric Garcetti recorded the R&B song "101SlowJam", backed by musicians from Roosevelt High School, and issued it via a video on his own YouTube channel. The public service announcement video advertised the closure of parts of the 101 Freeway to accommodate the demolition of the viaduct.

Notable alumni
	
 Chris Arreola - professional heavyweight boxer
 Lou Adler – Grammy Award winner and film producer; noted for Rocky Horror Picture Show and Up in Smoke
 Sam Balter (1909–1998) – All-American basketball player UCLA; gold medalist in 1936 Summer Olympics; member of SCSBA Hall of Fame
 Paul Bannai – first Japanese-American assemblyman in California
 Leo Buscaglia - writer and professor
 Lynn Cain – USC running back, played for Atlanta Falcons and Los Angeles Rams
 Leo Cantor (1919–1995) - NFL football player 
 Phil Carreón (1923–2010), big-band leader who gave Lennie Niehaus his first job as arranger and alto saxophonist 
 Vickie Castro - educator
 Gil Cedillo – California state senator
 Willie Davis (1940-2010) – MLB outfielder for Los Angeles Dodgers 1960–72; 2-time All-Star and 2-time World Series champion
 Mike Davis - American writer, historian, and political theorist; Author of City of Quartz
 Philip "Phil" Erenberg (1909–1992) - gymnast and Olympic silver medalist
 Felipe Esparza - Stand-up comedian
 Michael Galitzen (Mickey Riley) – 1932 Summer Olympics gold medalist, springboard diving
 Mike Garrett – football player, Heisman Trophy winner for USC 1965; later USC athletic director
 Joe Gold – founder of Gold's Gym
 Paul Gonzales – first Mexican-American winner of boxing gold medal, 1984 Summer Olympics
William Harmatz (1931–2011) - Thoroughbred horse racing jockey 
 Frances Hashimoto - former president and CEO of Mikawaya, credited as creator of mochi ice cream and introducing it to American consumer market
 Genaro Hernandez – world junior lightweight champion 1991–1994
 Robert Kinoshita – artist, art director, set and production designer in film and television from 1950s-'80s
 Herbert G. Klein - President Richard Nixon's communications director for executive branch
 Julian Nava - Los Angeles Unified School District Board of Education, U.S. Ambassador to Mexico 
 Lennie Niehaus – Emmy Award winner and Clint Eastwood's musical director
 Eugene Obregon – Medal of Honor in Korean War
 Harry Pregerson – first Jewish American appointed federal circuit judge, 9th Circuit Court of Appeals
 Myron Prinzmetal - cardiologist
 Ricky Romero – All-City Player of the Year; pitcher for Toronto Blue Jays
 Edward R. Roybal – LA city councilman 1949–62; U.S. House of Representatives 1963–1993
 Andy Russell - born as "Andrés Rábago" in Boyle Heights, Los Angeles, 1940s Mexican-American crooner of hits "Bésame Mucho" and "What a Diff'rence a Day Made"; later an international singing star in Mexico, Latin America, and Spain
 Shirlee Smith - author
 Donald Sterling - former owner of NBA's Los Angeles Clippers
 A. Wallace Tashima – first Japanese-American appointed federal circuit judge, 9th Circuit Court of Appeals
 Bobbi Trout – record-setting aviator of 1930s and 1940s, contemporary of Amelia Earhart and Pancho Barnes
 Antonio Villaraigosa – Mayor of Los Angeles, 2005–13
 Harold M. Williams – Chairman of Securities and Exchange Commission during Carter administration; president emeritus of Getty Center
 Howard Zieff – film director, Private Benjamin, House Calls, My Girl

References

 http://www.prnewswire.com/news-releases/local-latino-talent-wins-latvs-be-a-vj-contest-71469937.html July 29, 2003 press release
RICHARD OROSCO CLASS OF 1957 WAS THE 1ST. MEXICAN AMERICAN IRS Director for the state of Ca.

External links

 Roosevelt High School website
 GreatSchools information

Roosevelt High
Roosevelt
Boyle Heights, Los Angeles
Roosevelt High
Eastside Los Angeles
Educational institutions established in 1922
1922 establishments in California